Nimigea is a commune in Bistrița-Năsăud County, Transylvania, Romania, with 5,324 residents. It is composed of eight villages: Florești (Virágosberek), Mintiu (Oláhnémeti), Mititei (Mittye), Mocod (Szamosmakód), Mogoșeni (Szamosmagasmart), Nimigea de Jos (the commune center; Magyarnemegye), Nimigea de Sus (Oláhnemegye), and Tăure (Tóhát).

The commune lies on the Transylvanian Plateau, at the confluence of the river Someșul Mare with its left tributary, the Bratoșa.

At the 2011 census, 78% of inhabitants were Romanians, 13% Hungarians, and 6.6% Roma. 77.7% were Romanian Orthodox, 13.3% Reformed, and 5.5% Pentecostal.

Notable people 
 Ion Ciocan

References

External links
 

Communes in Bistrița-Năsăud County
Localities in Transylvania